Lose You Now is a 2021 EP released by American violinist, Lindsey Stirling.

Background
Lose You Now is Stirling's second EP, her first, "Lindsey Stomp", was released in 2010. The EP was produced as an exclusive for Record Store Day 2021, with 2000 copies pressed exclusively on single sided vinyl.

The record contains its titular track, "Lose You Now" released in 2021 with Mako, alongside a further four songs. It also included Stirling's 2020 single What You're Made Of produced for the video game, Azur Lane, with Kiesza featuring as a guest vocalist. The three remaining tracks were from Stirling's 2019 album, Artemis.

The cover art for the record continued Stirling's theme of manga art during the Artemis era.  The B side of the record was etched with butterfiles.

Track listing

Music videos

References

Lindsey Stirling albums
BMG Rights Management albums
2021 EPs
Record Store Day releases
Electronic EPs